The Conservative Party in the United States refers to various state parties that have no connection with one another and that support conservatism in the United States.

National level
There never has been an active national political party in the United States that used the name "Conservative."

The Conservative Party USA (organized January 6, 2009) is a 527 organization at present. However, it is organized to build and administer state political party affiliates of the national Conservative Party USA, (15 affiliates - 2021) after which it will obtain ballot access to operate as a national political party.  

The American Conservative Party was formed in 2008 and then decommissioned in 2016. It does not claim any members who ran for or held political office.

State level

Connecticut
In the late 1830s and early 1840s, state-level candidates were put forward on a Conservative Party line, although they were not successful. Some of these candidates, such as Elisha Phelps, had previously been associated with the National Republican Party.

Illinois
A conservative party in Illinois was established in 2018, largely to support State Senator Sam McCann's run for governor.

New Jersey
Voters in New Jersey may choose to register in the New Jersey Conservative Party (CP-NJ). As of February 2019 there are 10,610 registered members.

New York
The Conservative Party of New York State, founded in 1962. New York state's party has elected two men to the United States Congress:
 James L. Buckley, senator in the 94th Congress (1971–77), who caucused with the Republicans;
 William Carney, representative in the 96th, 97th, 98th, and 99th congresses (1979–87), who also caucused with the Republicans.

Virginia
See Conservative Party of Virginia (1965-1969).

Washington
See Conservative Party of Washington

Reconstruction-Era South
In the Reconstruction era after the Civil War, former Whigs in several Southern states formed parties with the "Conservative" or "Democratic-Conservative" name. Eventually they all merged into the Democratic Party, among them:
 Conservative Party (South Carolina)
 Conservative Party (Virginia, 1834): Two members were elected to the 26th Congress.
 Conservative Party (Virginia, 1867) Two representatives elected to the 40th Congress on the Conservative Party ticket.

See also
 Conservative Party (disambiguation)
 Republican Party
 National Conservative Political Action Committee
 American Conservative Union

References

Conservative parties in the United States
Political parties in the United States
State and local conservative parties in the United States